It's Now or Never is the only studio album by Ukrainian metalcore band Make Me Famous, which was released in March 2012 through Sumerian Records.

Critical reception

The album received mixed reviews. James Shotwell from Under the Gun Review said, "Overall, the record is not bad, and there are certainly some very notable tracks. I just can’t get over the fact that they sound so much like Asking Alexandria, who I love by the way, and it somewhat bothers me that they remind me of them so much. When looking for a new band to sink my teeth into I try to look for unique songs, clever lyrics and solid musicianship. I can find some of these elements, and this band has great potential, but I’m not sure they have made it there quite yet."

Todd Lyons from About.com strongly criticized the album saying, "Make Me Famous, with their debut It's Now Or Never, have become famous by igniting high-octane hatred across the metal diaspora. Hundreds of metal blogs agree, Make Me Famous is worse than a hot lead high colonic, . . . are they THAT bad? Yes."

Track listing

Personnel
 "It's Now or Never" credits adapted from AllMusic.

Make Me Famous
Serj Kravchenko – growled vocals, programming
Denis Shaforostov – clean vocals, screamed vocals, lead guitar, programming, drum programming
Sergei Hohlov – bass guitar, gang vocals, vocals on track 11
Jimmy X Rose – rhythm guitar, drum programming

Production
Denis Shaforostov – Engineer, Mastering, Mixing, producer
Serj Kravchenko – Artwork, Concept, Design, engineer, Mastering, Mixing, producer
Derek Brewer – Management
Brian Judge – Management
Ash Avildsen – Booking

Chart positions

References

2012 debut albums
Make Me Famous albums
Sumerian Records albums